Bernard Blistène (born 1955) is a French art curator. From  2013 to 2021 he was the director of the Musée national d'Art moderne.

References 

Directors of museums in France
French art critics
French art curators
Officiers of the Ordre des Arts et des Lettres
1955 births
Living people